An aspis (plural aspides), or porpax shield, sometimes mistakenly referred to as a hoplon (a term actually referring to the whole equipment of a hoplite), was the heavy wooden shield used by the infantry in various periods of ancient Greece.

Construction
An aspis was deeply dished and made primarily of wood. Some had a thin sheet of bronze on the outer face, often just around the rim. In some periods, the convention was to decorate the shield; in others, it was usually left plain.  

This large shield was made possible partly by its shape, which allowed it to be supported comfortably on the shoulder. The revolutionary part of the shield was, in fact, the grip. Known as an  grip, it placed the handle at the edge of the shield and was supported by a leather or bronze fastening for the forearm at the center, known as the porpax. This allowed hoplites more mobility with the shield, as well as the ability to capitalize on their offensive capabilities and better support the phalanx. The shield rested on a man's shoulders, stretching down to the knees. They were designed for a mass of hoplites to push forward into the opposing army, a move called othismos, and it was their most essential equipment. That the shield was convex made it possible for warriors to use it as a flotation device for crossing rivers, and its large round shape allowed it to be used for hauling the bodies of the dead from the battlefield.

Such shields did not tend to survive the passage of time very well, and only one aspis has survived into modernity with sufficient preservation to allow us to determine the details of its construction: this shield is called the "Bomarzo" or "Vatican" shield, and it is currently located in the Vatican, within the Museo Gregoriano Etrusco.  It was discovered in 1830 near Bomarzo in Lazio, central Italy.

See also
Ancient Greek warfare
Clipeus, a similar shield used by the Romans
Peltast, a light infantryman using a lighter pelte shield
Thyreophoroi and thorakitai, medium infantrymen using thyreos shields

References

External links
Classical Greek Shield Patterns

 Greek shields
 Ancient Greek military terminology